The Carmel Art Association (CAA) is a Not-for-profit arts organization and gallery located in Carmel-by-the-Sea, California. The CAA is Carmel's oldest gallery. It features the work of many local artists living on the Monterey Peninsula. Many of its members were  early California artists. The CAA is a 501(c)(3) organization. CAA was recorded with the National Register of Historic Places on May 10, 2002.

History
The CAA was founded on August 8, 1927, by a small group of artists who gathered at “Gray Gables,” the modest home and studio of Miss Josephine M. Culberston and Ida Johnson at the corner of Seventh and Lincoln in Carmel-by-the-Sea, California. The originator of the plan was Jennie V. Cannon of Berkeley, California, who was a frequent visitor to Carmel and owned a summer cottage there. Nineteen artists found their respective paths to Carmel from all corners of the world. Each desired a greater sense of community, a spirit of collaboration, and a place to show their work. Before the meeting concluded, they had established an association with a mission “to advance art and cooperation among artists, secure a permanent exhibition space, and promote greater fellowship between artists and the public." Pedro Joseph de Lemos of Carmel was elected the first president of the CAA in August 1927. A constitution presented by Ada B. Champlin was accepted with some amendments.

In late October 1927, the exhibition of 41 artists took place in Herbert Heron's Seven Arts Building in Carmel. Exhibitors were Mary DeNeale Morgan, John O'Shea, Percy Gray, Jennie Cannon, and others.

The association filed articles of incorporation on January 26, 1934. Directors included John O'Shea, William Ritschel, Jo Mora, Paul Dougherty, Armin Hansen, Edda Maxwell Health, and Charlton Fortune.

In 1933, the gallery was moved to its present location on Dolores Street, when the organization purchased the former studio of artist and playwright Ira Mallory Remsen (1876-1928), with a loan from businessman Barnet J. Segal (1898-1985). Architect Clay Otto designed and Michael J. Murphy did the expansion of the existing building in 1938. It is a two-story wood and adobe brick and concrete block framed art gallery. The sculpture garden in front of the building was designed by artist William P. Silva (1859-1948). The gallery was registered with the California Register of Historical Resources on May 10, 2002. The building is significant under California Register criterion 1, as the oldest, continuously operating artist-owned cooperative art gallery in California.

Exhibitions

One of the first CAA exhibitions was on June 3, 1928 at the Stanford Art Gallery of oil paintings and watercolors by 25 of its members. One of the paintings was by Percy Gray called "Coast Near Monterey".

Jo Mora was active in the Carmel community and served on the board of directors of the CAA, where his sculptures were exhibited between 1927 and 1934.

Salvador Dalí joined the CAA. On June 8, 1947, he participated as an art expert and juror in a contest sponsored by CAA that awarded high school students from Albany High School in Oakland, California.

On July 28, 1988, the CAA held an exhibition of paintings and graphics by six early members. Francis McComas was one of them.

Awards
The gallery has won awards in the following areas:
 The Award of Excellence (Carmel Chamber of Commerce)
 Best Art Gallery in Monterey County (Monterey County Weekly)
 Golden Pine Cone Award (Carmel Pine Cone)

Publications
 Carmel Art Association: Today. Author: Carmel Art Association, Carmel, Calif., 1988, 
 Carmel Art Association: its legends and legacies 1927–2007. Authors: Dick Crispo; Lisa Crawford Watson. Carmel, Calif., 2007, 
 Richard Lofton, 1908-1966: a painter's painter. Carmel, Calif., 2004, 
 John O'Shea and friends: John O'Shea, Burton Shepard Boundary, Theodore Morrow Criley : Carmel Art Association, August 5 through August 31, 1993. Carmel, Calif., 1993.

Notable members

References

External links

 Carmel Art Association website
 Traditional Find Arts Organization and CAA

Arts organizations established in 1927
Art in California
Art museums and galleries in California
American artist groups and collectives
Arts organizations disestablished in the 20th century
1927 establishments in California